The Willie Nelson Lifetime Achievement Award, instituted in 2012 during the 46th CMA Awards, is given by the Country Music Association. The presentation of the award is intended to "honor an iconic artist who has attained the highest degree of recognition in Country Music (that) achieved both national and international prominence and stature through concert performances, humanitarian efforts, philanthropy, record sales, and public representation at the highest level", with the condition that the recipient  "must have positively impacted and contributed to the growth of the genre over time".

The award, first presented to Willie Nelson, and named after him, was designed by Chicago manufacturer R.S. Owens & Company. The trophy was built resembling the "bullet shape" of a regular CMA award, formed by two aluminum struts that support a bronze medallion on top, with the entire structure attached to a walnut base.

Recipients
 Indicates a posthumous award

a. Kristofferon was not in attendance when he received the award as he had a show scheduled on the same night. 
b. Lynn was not in attendance when she received her award.

Sources:

References

Country Music Association Awards
American music awards
Lifetime achievement awards
Awards established in 2012
2012 establishments in Tennessee